American rapper Mase has released three studio albums and twenty-two singles, including ten as a featured artist.

Albums

Studio albums

Singles

As lead artist

As featured artist

Other charted songs

Guest appearances

Notes 

A  "Get Ready" did not enter the Billboard Hot 100, but peaked at number 25 on the Bubbling Under Hot 100 Singles chart, which acts as a 25-song extension to the Hot 100.
B  "Welcome Back" and "Breathe, Stretch, Shake" charted as a double A-side single in the United Kingdom.
C  "Stay Out of My Way" did not enter the Hot R&B/Hip-Hop Songs chart, but peaked at number 9 on the Bubbling Under R&B/Hip-Hop Singles chart, which acts as a 25-song extension to the Hot R&B/Hip-Hop Songs chart.

References

External links
 
 
 

Hip hop discographies
Discographies of American artists